Victor Vashi (D. 1990) was a Hungarian political cartoonist who "cartooned his way through the years of Nazi and Soviet occupation of his country."

Biography
There is very little  recorded information on the life of Victor Vashi. Most of the information that is available can be found in the brief text on the back of his book Red Primer for Children and Diplomats, a humorous cartoon history of communism in the Soviet Union, published in 1967, on the 50th anniversary of the October Revolution.   He also co-authored a satirical cartoon book titled The Sing Along with Khrushchev Coloring Book, cleverly written from the perspective of Nikita Khrushchev's granddaughter writing to her pen pal Caroline Kennedy.

Vashi was imprisoned by the Soviets in the Gödöllő prison camp. Locked in solitary confinement, he was overlooked the day when the gulag was emptied and all able-bodied men were sent to Siberia. Victor managed to escape to Austria in December 1948, and he eventually emigrated to the United States.

In 1963 and 1964, Victor Vashi was living at 810 A Street, S.E. in Washington, D.C., while working at McCoy Art Studio, on Connecticut Avenue, owned by Tom McCoy of Bethesda Maryland.

During the 1970s, Vashi was the chief cartoonist for the Machinist union newspaper at its headquarters on Connecticut Avenue near Dupont Circle in Washington D.C. He was very kind and doted on the children of headquarters executives who visited, even entertaining and giving drawing tips to young talent. It is rumored that he returned to his native  Hungary near the end of his life, where he lived for  a few years before his death in 1990.

Education
Victor Vashi was a graduate of the Hungarian Royal Academy of Fine Arts.

Career

Victor Vashi's early career was a cartoonist for one of Budapest's leading newspapers, the 8 Orai Ujsag.

Victor's style is similar to that of American political cartoonist Herbert Block. Although, discrete evidence of study or influence by Herbert Block cannot be determined.

Affiliated newspapers
After his escape to Austria, Victor cartooned for various European newspapers:

 Salzburger Nachrichten of Salzburg
 Wiener Kurier of Vienna
 Hungaria of Munich
 Emigrans Szabad Szaj of Paris
 Paraat of Amsterdam

His work was featured throughout his career in several other newspapers:
 Magyarsag of Pittsburgh
 Kepes Magyar Magazin of New York
 The Machinist and Machinist Journal of Washington D.C.
 Federation of Hungarian Former Political Prisoners of New York

The Sing along with Khrushchev Coloring Book
This may be Vashi's first work in book form. It is a satirical letter from Khrushchev's granddaughter, "Nyetochka," to Caroline Kennedy. The 24 pages of text and cartoons are written from the perspective of Nyetochka and makes fun of her "grandpa" and socialist uncles, such as her favorite "Uncle Fidel," who she recommends to color "a dirty brown," or her "Uncle Nehru", who she recommends coloring a "shocking pink." A cartoon of the Berlin Wall suggests "color West Berlin green, because the grass is always greener on the other side. For East Berlin a kind of drab will do." Khrushchev appears throughout as a caricature wearing only one shoe, a reference to his famous shoe pounding spectacle at the United Nations.

The text of the book was written by Ilona Fabian with all the cartoons drawn by Vashi. The coloring book was self-published in the United States in 1962 under the Sov-o'Press imprint.

In February, 1964, the coloring book was brought up at the House Un-American Activities Committee when James D. Atkinson, an associate professor of government at Georgetown University in support of a bill creating a Freedom Commission, as an example of the sort of work that such a commission would encourage.

Red Primer for Children and Diplomats
This is Victor Vashi's magnum opus, a humorous historical retrospective of the Soviet Union told in cartoons, on its 50th anniversary. The book's foreword states, "Those who do not read history are condemned to repeat it." The book is a mix of pen and ink sketches.

The book was first published in the United States in June 1967, in a paperback edition by Viewpoint Books (which no longer exists). The book apparently sold well as original copies are often available from dealers in used books. The book is now available in an online edition.

References

Hungarian editorial cartoonists
Hungarian satirists
World War II prisoners of war held by the Soviet Union
Hungarian comics artists
Year of birth missing
Year of death missing